Senator Woodworth may refer to:

Almon Woodworth (1841–1908), Washington State Senate
Arthur W. Woodworth (1823–1919), Vermont State Senate
Dempster Woodworth (1844–1922), California State Senate
Frederick A. Woodworth (died 1865), California State Senate
Frederick L. Woodworth (1877–1944), Michigan State Senate
James Hutchinson Woodworth (1804–1869), Illinois State Senate
John Woodworth (New York politician) (1768–1858), New York State Senate
Laurin D. Woodworth (1837–1897), Ohio State Senate